Hollywood Star Time may refer to:

 Hollywood Star Time (dramatic anthology), a radio dramatic anthology series
 Hollywood Star Time (interview program), a radio interview program